Khas people popularly known as Khas Arya are an Indo-Aryan ethno-linguistic group native to the Himalayan region of South Asia, what is now present-day Nepal, Indian states of  Uttarakhand, West Bengal and Sikkim. Historically, Khas were the speakers of an ancient Khas language from the Indo-Aryan language family and the earliest recorded speakers of the Western Pahari languages. The large portion of the Indo-Aryan speakers throughout lower Himalayas were the Khas people. An intrusion of this tribe from the Western and Northwestern Himalayas into Central Himalayas is substantiated by the early linguistic evidences related to the Nepali language. They were also known as Parbatiyas/Parbates and are currently known as Paharis/Pahadis. They were also referred to as Yartse in Tibet and are also known as Khasan by Bhotia people. The term Khas has now become obsolete, as the Khas people have adopted communal identities because of the negative stereotypes associated with the term Khas. In Nepal the native speaker of Nepali language are known as Khas.

According to the Constitution of Nepal, Brahmins, Kshetris, Thakuris, and Sanyasis (Dashnami) who are citizens of Nepal should be considered as "Khas Arya" for electoral purposes.

Origin

Indo-Aryan origin theories
They have been connected to the Khasas mentioned in the ancient Hindu literature. Irish linguist Sir G.A. Grierson asserted that "..the great mass of the Aryan speaking population of the lower Himalaya from Kashmir to Darjeeling is inhabited by tribes descended from the ancient Khasas of Mahabharata." Historian Bal Krishna Sharma and Dor Bahadur Bista speculates that the Khas people were of Indo-European origin. Historian Baburam Acharya speculates that Khas are a sub-clan of Aida, an "Arya" clan that originated at Idavritt (modern day Kashmir to Nepal). Khas were living in the Idavaritt in the 3rd millennium BCE. and the original meaning of the term Khas was Raja or Kshatriya (Yoddha). He further speculates that Kashmir has been named from its local residents Khas as Khasmir. In the 2nd millennium B.C.E., one group of Khas migrated towards Iran while the other group migrated east of Sutlej river settling only in the hill regions up to Bheri River. Historian Balkrishna Pokhrel contends that Khas were not the Vedic Aryans but Aryans of the latter periods like the Gurjara, Darada, Shaka, and Pallava. He further asserts that post-Vedic Aryans were akin to Vedic Aryans in terms of language and culture. Irish linguist Sir George Abraham Grierson asserted that the Khasas were one of the warrior "Kshatriya tribe of Aryan origin" with linguistic connections to both Sanskrit and Iranian languages, who lost claim to Vedichood due to non-observance of Vedic rules. Roman geographer Pliny The Elder described the ancient Khasas/Khasiras (referred as 'Casiri') as one of the Indian ethnicity.

Saka origin theories
Historian Rahul Sankrityayan proposes the origin of the Khasha tribe from the Shaka tribe and further identifies Khashas and Shakas to have been two different waves of the same race. The Shakas were in Indian subcontinent before the first century BCE while the Khashas spread over the Himalayas and extensively populated the mountainous regions of Uttarakhand and the later waves of Shakas got diffused into them. Historian Omchand Handa contends that the "sun worship" among Khashas is a Shaka legacy and perhaps the standing Surya images with long boots which was commonly found at the Khasha belt of Himalaya. Some examples of it are the Bara-Aditya at Katarmal and Surya images of Baijnath, Bageshwar and Dwarahat.

History

Medieval history in Uttarakhand-Nepal

Khasas are believed to have arrived in the western reaches of Nepal at the beginning of first-millennium B.C. or middle of first-millennium A.D. from the north-west. The earliest linguistic evidences related to Nepali language also substantiates the linguistic intrusion of an Indo-Aryan speaking Khasa tribe from the West or Northwest Himalayas into Central Himalayas at the present day regions of Western Nepal. It is likely that they absorbed people from different ethnic groups during this immigration. They had extensively populated the mountainous regions of Uttarakhand and they had entirely dominated the inner Himalayan belt up to Nepal. Previously, Khashas had strongly established themselves from Afghanistan to Nepal from ancient period and as per internal evidences, they managed the village level theocratic republics like Gram-Rajya and Mandals under various local clans and identities. The ruling Katyuri dynasty (700-1065 CE) of Kumaon who were of Khas origin, was one of the ruling houses of Joshimath that claimed the sovereignty over other Gram Rajyas of the entire territory. The Katyuris ruled from Joshimath in the Alaknanda Valley and later they shifted their capital to Baijnath. They have also been connected to the medieval Khasa Malla kingdom. The Khasa kings of West Nepal-Uttarakhand formed the famous Malla Kingdom, which ruled Humla from the eleventh century before collapsing and splintering into local chiefdoms during the fourteenth century. In the initial phase, majority of Khas people became Brahmins and others became Kshatriyas.

History in Kashmir 

The ruling Lohara dynasty (1003-1320 CE) of Kashmir were from the Khas tribe as per the 12th century text Rajatarangini written by the local Kashmiri Pandit historian Kalhana. Furthermore, Rajatarangini describes the rulers of Rajapuri (modern Rajauri) as the "lord of the Khasas". The Khasa chiefs of Rajapuri freely intermarried with Kshatriya rulers of Kashmir while the Khasa chief of Lohara, Simharaja, married a daughter of Shahi Kings of Kabul. The descendants of the royal family of Rajauri later became Muslim Rajput chiefs and they retained the rulership of the territory till 19th century. The inhabitants of Karnah region in northwestern Kashmir, were Khasas and they were represented by the modern Bomba (tribe) who independently ruled the northwestern Kashmir till the Sikh conquest of Kashmir. There was also an independent Khasa lord at the castle located in the foot of Banahal Pass in the territory of Visalata and Dengapala ("Thakkura Dengapala") was a Khasa chief at the banks of Chandrabhaga (modern Chenab river).

Modern history in Nepal

Until the 19th century, the Gorkhali referred to their country as Khas Desh (Khas country). As they annexed the various neighboring countries (such as Nepal or Newa of the Newar people) to the Gorkha kingdom, the terms such as Khas and Newar ceased to be used as the names of countries. The 1854 legal code (Muluki Ain), promulgated by the Nepali Prime Minister Jung Bahadur Rana, himself a Khas, no longer referred to Khas as a country, rather as a jāt (species or community) within the Gorkha kingdom.

The Shah dynasty of the Gorkha Kingdom, as well as the succeeding Rana dynasty, spoke the Khas language (now called the Nepali language). However, they claimed to be Rajputs of western Indian origin, rather than the native Khas Kshatriyas. Since outside Nepal, the Khas social status was seen as inferior to that of the Rajputs, the rulers started describing themselves as natives of the Hill country, rather than that of the Khas country. Most people, however, considered the terms Khas and Parbatiya (Pahari/Pahadi or Hill people) as synonymous.

Jung Bahadur also re-labeled the Khas jāt as Chhetri in present-day Nepal. Originally, the Brahmin immigrants from the plains considered the Khas as low-caste because of the latter's neglect of high-caste taboos (such as alcohol abstinence). The upper-class Khas people commissioned the Bahun (Brahmin) priests to initiate them into the high-caste Chhetri order and adopted high-caste manners. Other Khas families who could not afford to (or did not care to) pay the Bahun priests also attempted to assume the Chhetri status but were not recognized as such by others. They are now called Matwali (alcohol-drinker Khas) Chhetris. Because of the adoption of the Chhetri identity, the term Khas is rapidly becoming obsolete. According to Dor Bahadur Bista (1991), "the Khas have vanished from the ethnographic map of Nepal".

Modern

Nepal
Modern-day Khas people are referred to as Hill Brahmin (Bahun), Hill Kshatriya (Thakuri/Chhetri) and Hill Dalit. Further, historian Pokharel adds the Gharti, Damai, Kami, Sarki, Hudka, Tamote, Gaine and Badi to the Khas communities. In modern times, Khas people are popularly referred by the term "Khas Arya".

India-Pakistan
In Kumaon and Garhwal regions of Uttarakhand in India, too, the term Khas has become obsolete. The Khas people of Kumaon termed as Kumaoni Jiagahar Rajput, after being elevated to the Rajput status by the Chand kings. The term Khas is almost obsolete, and people resent being addressed as Khas because of the negative stereotypes associated with this term. Furthermore, the Kanets of Kangra and Garhwal, Khasa of Jaunsar-Bawar and the bulk population of Garhwal and Kumaon (referred as "Khasia") are descended from the Khasas. Generally, the Khas people are referred as Rajputs or Kanets in the Himachal Pradesh. According to E.T. Atkinson, the Jaunsar-Bawar is the representative Khasiya tract and it 

Historian Sir Marc Aurel Stein identified the modern Khakha Rajputs of Azad Kashmir as the descendants of Khasas mentioned in the Rajatarangini. The Khasa tribe in Karnah region in northwestern Kashmir were represented by the modern Bomba (tribe).

Communities
Historian Balkrishna Pokhrel writes the communities or caste in Khas group were hill Bahun, Chhetri, Thakuri, Sannyasi, Gharti, Damai, Kami, Sarki, Hudka, Tamote, Gaine and Badi. The tribal designation Khas refers to in some contexts only to the alcohol drinker Khas group, i.e. Thakuri and Chhetri, but in other contexts may also include the low status (generally untouchable) occupational Khas groups such as Kāmi (blacksmiths), Damāi (tailors), and Sārki (shoemakers and leather workers). Khas people are addressed with the term Khayan or Parbatiya or Partyā, Parbaté meaning hill-dweller by Newars. The hill Khas tribe are in large part associated with the Gorkhali warriors.

Historian-linguist E.T. Atkinson in his 1886 CE Kumaon gazetteer, mentions that there are 250 'septs among Khasiya Brahmins' and 280 'septs among Khasiya Rajputs' who represent the Khasa tribe. He states that the 90% of the Brahmins of Kumaon belong to the Khas tribe. The Khasiya Brahmins are mentioned to have been chiefly cultivators and agriculturalists and most of them worship chiefly Bhairava, Shiva, Vishnu, the more common forms of the Shakti and village deities. Most of them derive their surnames from their village of origin. The Khasiyas of Uttarakhand never attempted to connect themselves with plain regions until recently they found that such connections increases personal dignity.

Khas people of the Western Himalayas are considered similar to the Khas people of the Garhwal, Kumaon and Nepal. They are generally referred as Rajputs or Kanets in the Himachal Pradesh. The Khasas of Jaunsar-Bawar who are represented by the Jaunsari Rajputs and Brahmins) practiced polyandrous marriages.

Languages
Irish Linguist George Abraham Grierson in his Linguistic Survey of India stated that the Khas tribe were the earliest recorded speakers of the Western Pahari languages. He further asserted that the Khas people made the bulk population of the Indo-Aryan speakers throughout the lower Himalaya from Kashmir to Darjeeling.

The Khas people of Nepal originally referred to their language as Khas kurā (Khas speech), which was also known as Parbatiya (the language of the hill country). The Newar people used the term Khayan Bhaya, Parbatiya and Gorkhali as a name for this language, Gorkhalis themselves started using this term to refer to their language at a later stage. In an attempt to disassociate himself with his Khas past, the Rana prime minister Jung Bahadur decreed that the term Gorkhali be used instead of Khas kurā to describe the language. Meanwhile, the British Indian administrators had started using the term Nepal (after Newar) to refer to the Gorkha kingdom. In the 1930s, the Gorkha government also adopted this term to describe their country. Subsequently, the Khas language also came to be known as Nepali language. It has become a national language of Nepal and lingua franca among the majority of population of Northern region of West Bengal, Sikkim and Bhutan. Historian Balkrishna Pokhrel contends that the Khas language of Nepal belonged to neither the Iranian language family, nor the Indian languages, but to the mid Indo-Iranian languages.

Notable people

Medieval Khas families and dynasties
Katyuri kings
Lohara dynasty
Khas Malla rulers

Modern Khas
Bir Bhadra Thapa
Sanukaji Amar Singh Thapa
Bhimsen Thapa 
Jung Bahadur Rana
Kalu Pande (Kaji) 
Prithvi Narayan Shah 
Shivaram Singh Basnyat (Badabir senapanti) 
Kehar Singh Basnyat
Damodar Pandey
Abhiman Singh Basnyat
Kirtiman Singh Basnyat
Bakhtawar Singh Basnyat
Dhokal Singh Basnyat
Rana Jang Pande
Kunwar Inderjit Singh
Subarna Shamsher Rana
Sher Bahadur Thapa
Surya Bahadur Thapa
Ranga Nath Poudyal
Manisha Koirala
Sujata Koirala
Girija Prasad Koirala
Jhalak Man Gandarbha
Sunil Chhetri, football player

See also
Nepali language
Kumaoni language
Garhwali language 
Indo-Aryan migrations

Notes

References

Bibliography

 

 

 

 
 
 
 
 

 </ref>

External links

 
Indo-Aryan peoples
Ethnic groups in Nepal
Ethnic groups in India
Himalayan peoples
Indigenous peoples of Nepal